Donald Laverne Katz (August 1, 1907 near Jackson, Michigan – May 29, 1989 Ann Arbor, Michigan) was an American chemist and chemical engineer.

The 1983 National Medal of Science was presented to Katz by President Ronald Reagan "for solving many practical engineering problems by delving into a wide group of sciences and making their synergistic effects evident."

 Katz was also noted for developing a hazard rating system for dangerous bulk cargoes. The New York Times  called Katz an "oil expert". The National Academy of Engineering called him a "world leader" in reservoir engineering.

Katz was chairman of the Chemical Engineering Department and A. H. White University Professor at the University of Michigan. He was also a member of the National Academy of Engineering.

He was a father to Marvin L. Katz and Linda Katz.

Notable awards and honors 
Katz received the following distinctions and honors:
 1950 	Hanlon Award, Gas Processors Association
 1959 	President, American Institute of Chemical Engineers
 1959 	Michigan Engineer of the Year, Society of Petroleum Engineers
 1962 	Distinguished Lecturer, Society of Petroleum Engineers
 1963 	Visiting Professor, National School of Chemistry, Rio de Janeiro
 1964 	John Franklin Carll Award, Society of Petroleum Engineers
 1964 	Distinguished Faculty Achievement Award, University of Michigan
 1964 	Founders Award, American Institute of Chemical Engineers
 1967 	Warren K. Lewis Award, American Institute of Chemical Engineers
 1968 	Member, National Academy of Engineering
 1968 	William H. Walker Award, American Institute of Chemical Engineers
 1969 	Honorary Member, Phi Lambda Upsilon
 1970 	Mineral Industries Award, American Institute of Mining Engineers
 1972 	Distinguished Public Service Award, U.S. Coast Guard
 1975 	E. V. Murphree Award, American Chemical Society
 1977 	Gas Industry Research Award, American Gas Association
 1978 	Lucas Gold Medal, American Institute of Mining Engineers
 1979 	Award of Merit, Michigan Historical Society
 1983 	Selected as an Eminent Chemical Engineer, 75th Anniversary of American Institute of Chemical Engineers
 1983 	National Medal of Science
 1984 	Designated Distinguished Member, Society of Petroleum Engineers
 1986 	Honorary Member, American Institute of Mining Engineers

Education 
 1931 	B.S.E., Chemical Engineering, University of Michigan
 1932 	M.S., Chemical Engineering, University of Michigan
 1933 	Ph.D., Chemical Engineering, University of Michigan

References 

1907 births
1989 deaths
20th-century American chemists
20th-century American engineers
University of Michigan College of Engineering alumni
Members of the United States National Academy of Engineering
People from Jackson County, Michigan
University of Michigan faculty
People from Ann Arbor, Michigan